is a Japanese animation studio located in Nerima, Tokyo Prefecture. It was established on January 29, 1999 by Nagateru Kato, a former animator from Tatsunoko Production. They have produced a number of series to date, most notably their adaptations of School Days and High School DxD, among others such as Hand Maid May, I My Me! Strawberry Eggs, UFO Ultramaiden Valkyrie, and Kannazuki no Miko.

Works
A list of series produced or co-produced by TNK.

TV series

OVA
Cosplay Complex (2002)
Cosplay Complex: Extra Identification (2004)
Papa to Kiss in the Dark (2005)
Itsudatte My Santa! (2005) 
School Days: Valentine Days (2008)
High School DxD OVAs (2012, 2013 & 2015)

ONA
Busou Shinki (2011)

Films
Suki ni Naru Sono Shunkan o (2016, as Qualia Animation)
Zutto Mae Kara Suki Deshita (2016, as Qualia Animation)

References

External links
Official website 

 
Animation studios in Tokyo
Japanese animation studios
Japanese companies established in 1999
Mass media companies established in 1999
Nerima